Ledøje is a small town located in the Egedal Municipality, in the Capital Region of Denmark.

Notable people 
 Michael Gottlieb Bindesbøll (1800 in Ledøje – 1856) a Danish architect active during the Danish Golden Age

References

Cities and towns in the Capital Region of Denmark
Egedal Municipality